Take a Bryant Step is an album by pianist Ray Bryant recorded and released by Cadet Records in 1967.

Track listing 
 "To Sir with Love" (Mark London. Don Black) – 3:05
 "Ramblin'" (Ornette Coleman) – 3:10
 "Natural Woman" (Gerry Goffin, Carole King, Jerry Wexler) – 2:35
 "Ode to Billy Joe" (Bobby Gentry) – 3:13
 "Up-Up and Away" (Jimmy Webb) – 3:18
 "Paint It Black" (Mick Jagger, Keith Richards) – 3:17
 "Pata Pata" (Miriam Makeba, Jerry Ragovoy) – 3:07
 "Poochie" (Richard Evans) – 3:07
 "Yesterday" (John Lennon, Paul McCartney) – 2:40
 "Paper Cup" (Webb) – 2:55
 "Doing My Thing" (Evans) – 2:40
 "Dinner On the Grounds" (Loonis McGlohon) – 3:28

Personnel 
Ray Bryant – piano
The Richard Evans Orchestra
Ray Bryant (tracks 1-4, 6 & 8), Richard Evans (tracks 5, 7, 8 & 10-12) – arrangement

References 

1967 albums
Ray Bryant albums
Cadet Records albums